Kyzyl-Yar (Qıźılyar) is a rural locality (a village) in Tyuryushevsky Selsoviet, Buzdyaksky District, Bashkortostan, Russia. The population was 174 as of 2010. There is 1 street.

Geography 
Kyzyl-Yar is located 42 km north of Buzdyak (the district's administrative centre) by road. Sabayevo is the nearest rural locality.

References 

Rural localities in Buzdyaksky District